Martin Kodrić (born 8 June 1997 in Zagreb) is a racing driver from Croatia. He competes in the International GT Open for Teo Martín Motorsport.

Racing record

Career summary

* Season still in progress.

† Guest driver ineligible to score points

Complete Bathurst 12 Hour results

Complete Blancpain GT Series Sprint Cup results

References

External links
Profile at Driver Database

Croatian motorsport people
1997 births
Living people
British GT Championship drivers
Toyota Gazoo Racing drivers
Formula Renault Eurocup drivers
Formula Renault 2.0 NEC drivers
Formula Renault 2.0 Alps drivers
Blancpain Endurance Series drivers
International GT Open drivers
Strakka Racing drivers
Euronova Racing drivers
Teo Martín Motorsport drivers
Fortec Motorsport drivers
Australian Endurance Championship drivers
Formula Renault BARC drivers
24H Series drivers